Clethrophora is a genus of moths of the family Nolidae. The genus was erected by George Hampson in 1894.

Species
Clethrophora angulipennis A. E. Prout, 1924
Clethrophora distincta (Leech, 1889)
Clethrophora gonophora A. E. Prout, 1924
Clethrophora virida (Heylaerts, 1890)

References

Chloephorinae